Zeno of Sidon (c. 150 – c. 75 BC) was a Greek Epicurean philosopher from the Seleucid city of Sidon. His writings have not survived, but there are some epitomes of his lectures preserved among the writings of his pupil Philodemus.

Life
Zeno was born in the city of Sidon. He was a contemporary of Cicero, who heard him when at Athens.

He was sometimes termed the "leading Epicurean." Cicero states that Zeno was contemptuous of other philosophers, and even called Socrates "the Attic Buffoon (scurram Atticum)."  He was a disciple of Apollodorus, and Cicero and Diogenes Laërtius both  describe him as an accurate and polished thinker.

Philosophy
Zeno held that happiness is not merely dependent upon present enjoyment and prosperity, but also on a reasonable expectation of their continuance and appreciation.

Zeno's writings have not survived, but among the charred papyrus remains at the Villa of the Papyri at Herculaneum, there is an Epitome of Conduct and Character from the Lectures of Zeno written by his pupil Philodemus. It contains the essays On Frank Criticism and On Anger.

Zeno also studied the philosophy of mathematics based on the derivation of all knowledge from experience.  He criticized Euclid, seeking to show that deductions from the fundamental principles of geometry cannot, on their own, be proved:

Notes

References

2nd-century BC births
70s BC deaths
1st-century BC philosophers
Epicurean philosophers
Roman-era philosophers in Athens
Phoenician philosophers